Adama is the family name of several fictional characters in the Battlestar Galactica sci-fi universe. 

In the Original Continuity:
Commander Adama, initially a member of the Council and then President of the Colonies and Commander of the Battlestar Galactica

In the New Continuity:
William Adama, Commander of Battlestar Galactica
Lee Adama, son of William Adama
Zak Adama, the younger son of William Adama
Carolanne Adama, the mother of Zak and Lee, and ex-wife of William Adama
Joseph Adama, the father of William.
Evelyn Adama, the mother of William.

See also
Commander Adama (disambiguation)

External links
See the Battlestar Wiki for more information on the Adama clan.

Battlestar Galactica characters